Ercheia careona is a species of moth of the family Erebidae first described by Charles Swinhoe in 1918. It is found in Indonesia, where it has been recorded from Kaloa Island near Sulawesi.

References

Moths described in 1918
Ercheiini
Moths of Indonesia
Taxa named by Charles Swinhoe